The Concentration for the Liberation of Aruba (Conscientisacion pa Liberacion di Aruba) is a political party in Aruba. 
At the elections for the Estates, 28 September 2001, the party won 1.1% of popular votes and none of the 21 seats.

Political parties in Aruba